North Fork Township is a former township of Pope County, Arkansas. It was located in the north central part of the county.

Cities, towns, and villages 

 Solo

References 
 United States Board on Geographic Names (GNIS)
 United States National Atlas

External links 
 US-Counties.com
 

Townships in Pope County, Arkansas
Townships in Arkansas